Giuliano Besson (born 1 January 1950) is an Italian former alpine skier who competed in the 1972 Winter Olympics.

The twins Anzi and Besson
In the 1970s the legend of the two skiers of the valanga azzurra (blue avalanche) was born, Stefano Anzi and Giuliano Besson who were nicknamed i gemelli (the twins) because on two occasions they concluded an important downhill race in the same position, on 7 February 1972 at the 1972 Winter Olympics in Sapporo, Japan both finished in 11th place ex-aequo and on 26 January 1974 both finished in second place still ex-aequo on the legendary Streiff in Kitzbuehl, Austria in a World Cup race.

World Cup results
Besson boasts one podium in the World Cup.
Podium

Olympic results

See also
 Stefano Anzi (his sporty twin and than firm)

References

External links
 
 AnziBesson

1950 births
Living people
Italian male alpine skiers
Olympic alpine skiers of Italy
Alpine skiers at the 1972 Winter Olympics
People from Sauze d'Oulx
Sportspeople from the Metropolitan City of Turin
20th-century Italian people